The Korea International Broadcasting Foundation (KIBF; Korean: 한국국제방송교류재단) is a South Korean non-profit organization established to broadcast Korean content to promote interest in Korea globally. The foundation operates Arirang TV and Arirang Radio.

The foundation's offerings compete with KBS World (owned by state owned broadcaster KBS) which also broadcasts Korean content overseas.

History

The foundation was established April 10, 1996, and began domestic broadcasting in 1997. Overseas broadcasting commenced in the Asia-Pacific region in 1999 and broadcasts to Europe, North Africa and the Americas started in 2000. In 2003, the foundation established Arirang FM Jeju, an English language FM radio station in South Korea. Arabic language broadcasting commenced in 2004. In 2015, Arirang launched a channel on the UN's in-house broadcast network.

In May 2020, Arirang TV signed a memorandum of understanding with The Korea Times.

See also
 Arirang TV
 Arirang Radio

References 

Foundations based in South Korea
Mass media companies of South Korea
Communications and media organizations
Organizations established in 1996